A climbing wall is an artificially constructed wall with grips for hands and feet, usually used for indoor climbing, but sometimes located outdoors. Some are brick or wooden constructions, but on most modern walls, the material most often used is a thick multiplex board with holes drilled into it. Recently, manufactured steel and aluminum have also been used.  The wall may have places to attach belay ropes, but may also be used to practice lead climbing or bouldering.

Each hole contains a specially formed t-nut to allow modular climbing holds to be screwed onto the wall. With manufactured steel or aluminum walls, an engineered industrial fastener is used to secure climbing holds.  The face of the multiplex board climbing surface is covered with textured products including concrete and paint or polyurethane loaded with sand. In addition to the textured surface and hand holds, the wall may contain surface structures such as indentions (incuts) and protrusions (bulges), or take the form of an overhang, underhang or crack.

Some grips are formed to mimic the conditions of outdoor rock, including some that are oversized and can have other grips bolted onto them.

History
The earliest artificial climbing walls were typically small concrete faces with protrusions made of medium-sized rocks for hand holds. Schurman Rock in Seattle, WA is believed to be the first artificial climbing structure in the United States, constructed in 1939.

The modern artificial climbing wall began in the UK. The first wall was created in 1964 by Don Robinson, a lecturer in Physical Education at the University of Leeds, by inserting pieces of rock into a corridor wall. The first commercial wall was built in Sheffield, traditionally England's centre for climbing due to its proximity to the Peak District. The first indoor climbing gym in the United States was established by Vertical World in Seattle in 1987.

Wall types

The simplest type of wall is of plywood construction, known colloquially in the climbing community as a 'woody', with a combination of either bolt-on holds or screw-on holds. Bolt-on holds are fixed to a wall with iron bolts that are inserted through the hold, which will have specific bolt points, and then fixed into pre-allocated screw-threaded holes in the wall. Screw-on holds are, by contrast, usually much smaller, owing to the nature of their fixing. These holds are connected to the wall by screws, which may be fastened anywhere on the wall's surface.

Some other types of walls include slabs of granite, concrete sprayed onto a wire mesh, pre-made fiberglass panels, large trees, manufactured steel and aluminum panels, textured fiberglass walls and inflatables. A newer innovation is the rotating climbing wall: a mechanical, mobile wall that rotates like a treadmill to match you climbing up.

Indoor climbing
Indoor climbing is an increasingly popular form of rock climbing performed on artificial structures that attempt to mimic the experience of outdoor rock. The first indoor climbing gym in North America, Vertical World in Seattle, was established in 1987. The first indoor climbing hall in the world was inaugurated in Bolzano, Italy in 1974 by Erich Abram.

The proliferation of indoor climbing gyms has increased the accessibility, and thus the popularity, of the sport of climbing.  Since environmental conditions (ranging from the structural integrity of the climbing surfaces to equipment wear, to proper use of equipment) can be more controlled in such a setting, indoor climbing is perhaps a safer and more friendly introduction to the sport.

The first indoor walls tended to be made primarily of brick, which limited the steepness of the wall and variety of the hand holds. More recently, indoor climbing terrain is constructed of plywood over a metal frame, with bolted-on plastic hand and footholds, and sometimes spray-coated with texture to simulate a rock face.

Most climbing competitions are held in climbing gyms, making them a part of indoor climbing.

Compared to outdoor climbing
Indoor and outdoor climbing can differ in techniques, style and equipment. Climbing artificial walls, especially indoors, is much safer because anchor points and holds are able to be more firmly fixed, and environmental conditions can be controlled. During indoor climbing, holds are easily visible in contrast with natural walls where finding a good hold or foothold may be a challenge. Climbers on artificial walls are somewhat restricted to the holds prepared by the route setter, whereas on natural walls they can use every slope or crack in the surface of the wall. Some typical rock formations can be difficult to emulate on climbing walls.

Construction
The most common construction method involves bolting resin hand and foot holds onto wooden boards. The boards can be of varying height & steepness (from completely horizontal 'roofs' to near-vertical 'slabs') with a mixture of holds attached. These can vary from very small 'crimps', and 'pinches', and slanted-surfaced 'slopers', to 'jugs', which are often large and easy to hold. This variety, coupled with the ability for the climbs to be changed by moving the holds to new positions on the wall, has resulted in indoor climbing becoming a very popular sport.

Equipment
Proper climbing equipment must be used during indoor climbing.
Most climbing gyms lend harnesses, ropes and belay devices. Some also lend climbing shoes and chalk bags. Some climbing gyms require use of chalk balls (as opposed to loose chalk) to reduce chalk dust in the air and chalk spills when a chalk bag is tipped over or stepped on. Reducing chalk in the air helps to avoid clogging ventilation systems and reduces the dust that accumulates on less-than-vertical surfaces.

Routes and grading

Holds come in different colours, those of the same colour often being used to denote a route, allowing routes of different difficulty levels to be overlaid on one another. Coloured tape placed under climbing holds is another way that is often used to mark different climbing routes. In attempting a given route, a climber is only allowed to use grips of the designated colour as handholds, but is usually allowed to use both handholds and footholds of the designated colour and surface structures and textures of the "rockface" as footholds.

The grade (difficulty) of the route is usually a consensus decision between the setter of the route and the first few people who climb the route. Many indoor climbing walls have people who are assigned to set these different climbing routes.  These people are called route setters or course setters. As indoor climbing walls are often used to check the development of climbers' ability, climbs are color-coded.

Each gym has a "designated" path to climb, known as the "route". Each route is distinguished either by an indicated piece of tape or a monochromatic system of climbing holds. If the route is taped, each hold on the designated route will have the same color tape, indicating which holds to grab or step on. Some newer gyms have converted to the monochromatic system:  instead of using colored tape as route indicators, this system uses colored climbing holds. Each monochromatic route is set using holds of a corresponding color; thus, climbers follow the holds of a single color throughout the route.

Route-setting is the design of routes through placing climbing holds in a strategic, technical, and fun way that sets how the route will flow. There are many different techniques involved with setting, and up to 5 levels of certifications are awarded to those qualified. Route setting can be defined as the back bone of indoor climbing; without a great set of routes, a gym cannot easily hope to keep a good hoard of climbers.

Gallery

See also
Climbing
Speed climbing wall
Rock-climbing equipment

References

External links

 UK Climbing Wall Manufacturers Association
 Climbing Wall Association, a US non-profit, industry trade association
 Odin - UK Mobile Climbing Wall Specialists 
 Indoorclimbing.com - a worldwide indoor climbing gym list.
 The British Mountaineering Council
 The Mountaineering Council of Scotland - indoor climbing page.

Types of wall
Types of climbing